Shaughnessy Golf & Country Club is a private golf club in Canada, located on Southwest Marine Drive in Vancouver, British Columbia.

History 
The Shaughnessy Heights Golf Course, today the Shaughnessy Golf and Country Club, had its beginning in 1911 in the office of CPR executive Richard Marpole. Nine businessmen, all residents of the prestigious and quickly developing enclave of Shaughnessy, agreed to turn  of land leased from the CPR into the Shaughnessy Heights Golf Course. The first nine holes opened on November 2, 1912; the second nine, the next year. The course was designed by A.V. Macan, an Irish immigrant from Wexford, who was one of the region's best golfers.

In the decades to follow, many of the names who played a prominent role in Vancouver's growth and prosperity also appeared on Shaughnessy's membership roster.

The club moved to new premises in the late 1950s, responding to the growth of the Vancouver urban region, and sold its original property. Macan, then in his late 70s, also designed the new course, which opened in the early 1960s. The land the club currently resides upon belongs to the Musqueam Nation but was leased to Shaughnessy through a series of meetings with federal agents that did not include the Nation. The land will not be returned to the Musqueam until 2033.

In 2011 the club hosted the Canadian Open for the fourth time, which coincides with Shaughnessy's 100th anniversary. It follows the 2011 British Open, which was held at Royal St George's Golf Club.

Tournaments hosted
British Columbia Open in 1928, 1938, 1948, 1952, 1955, 1962 and 1969
1936 Vancouver Jubilee Open, won by Ken Black
1948 Canadian Open, won by Charles Congdon
1966 Canadian Open, won by Don Massengale
1969 Molson's Canadian Open, won by Carol Mann
2005 Bell Canadian Open, won by Mark Calcavecchia
2011 RBC Canadian Open, won by Sean O'Hair
2023 CP Canadian Women's Open, winner TBD

See also
List of golf courses in British Columbia

References

External links

Golf clubs and courses in British Columbia
1911 establishments in British Columbia
Sport in Vancouver
Golf clubs and courses designed by A. V. Macan
Canadian Open (golf)